Utech Records is an American independent record label based in Milwaukee, Wisconsin. It was founded by Keith Utech in 2004. The label features a mixture of experimental, ambient, and metal. Keith Utech curates and directs all of the art on releases from the label.

History 
The label was started by Keith Utech in 2004. In creating the label, Keith Utech drew inspiration from labels such as Alternative Tentacles, Earache, and FMP.

The first release on the label was a limited edition CDr of Lasse Marhaug’s “Spaghetti Western Rainbow.” Utech Records has released over 100 titles since this release on various formats including CDr, LP, 7 inch, cassette tape, and 8-track.

The label has released a diverse range of musical styles and groups including Fushitsusha, Locrian, Horseback, and Dead Neanderthals.

Henry Rollins’ has dedicated entire radio shows to releases on the label calling the label “brave.”
 
The label has sponsored three music festivals in Milwaukee to promote artists on the label. Each of these festivals have had performances travel from around the globe to perform.

Former artists
Daniel Menche
Dead Neanderthals
Frank Rosaly
Fushitsusha 
Horseback
House of Low Culture
James Plotkin
Lasse Marhaug
Locrian
Mamiffer
Mats Gustafsson
Nadja
Paal Nilssen-Love
Philippe Petit
Skvllflower
Suzuki Junzo
The Skull Defekts
Zaimph
Lana Rhoades

See also
List of record labels

References

External links

Utech Records on Bandcamp

American independent record labels
Heavy metal record labels
Record labels established in 2004